Helen Engelstad (27 May 1908 – 5 March 1989) was a Norwegian author, art historian and educator.

Biography
Helen Wright was born in Elsinore, Helsingør Municipality, Denmark. Her childhood was characterized by prosperity and contact with the intellectual community. She continued her education at the University of Copenhagen. She later worked at the Danish Museum of Art & Design at the University for two years. She moved to Norway in 1930 when she married Norwegian art historian Eivind Stenersen Engelstad  (1900-1969). Their marriage was dissolved in 1951.

Helen Engelstad first worked as an assistant at the Stavanger Museum.  From 1946 to 1947 she was the manager of the museum at the Royal Manor of  Ledaal. From 1947 to 1976 she was the rector of the National Arts and Crafts Teacher's College, an entity now a part of the Oslo University College.

Helen Engelstad was appointed Knight of the 1st class Order of St. Olav in 1975 and also received King's Medal of Merit in gold.

Selected works
Strikkeboken: praktisk veiledning i moderne strikning, 1932
Norske navneduker, 1938
Messeklær og alterskrud. Middelalderske paramenter i Norge, 1941
Porselen og paramenter. Brukskunstneren Nora Gulbrandsens arbeider, 1944
Alle tiders drakt og mote, 1949
Vevkunst, 1953
Dobbeltvev i Norge, 1958
Vævninger fra det gamle Peru,  1985

References

Other sources
Engelstad, Helen (1952) Norwegian Textiles  (F Lewis, Publishers. Leigh-On-Sea, UK) 

1908 births
1989 deaths
Norwegian art historians
Rectors of universities and colleges in Norway
Women heads of universities and colleges
Danish emigrants to Norway
20th-century Norwegian historians
 University of Copenhagen alumni
20th-century Norwegian women writers
Norwegian women historians
Women art historians